Brendan Scott Crabb  FASM (born 13 September 1966) is an Australian microbiologist,  research scientist and director and chief executive officer of the Burnet Institute, based in Melbourne, Victoria, Australia.

Background and early career
Educated in Papua New Guinea and Australia, Crabb received a Bachelor of Science (Honours) from the University of Melbourne in the Department of Microbiology. In 1992, he completed his PhD in virology with Michael J. Studdert at the School of Veterinary Science also at the University of Melbourne. His PhD project, which explored proteins of equine herpes, led to a diagnostic test which could distinguish horses infected by the lethal equine herpes virus-1 and the less damaging equine herpes virus-4. He then completed a postdoctoral fellowship in the laboratory of Alan Cowman before starting his independent laboratory at the University of Melbourne.

Scientific career

Research focus
Crabb's main research focus is on the identification of new targets for therapeutic intervention in malaria and the development of a malaria vaccine. More broadly, his interests mirror the mission of the Burnet Institute - to improve the health of poor and vulnerable communities through research, education and public health.

In 2009, Crabb and his research team identified the export protein translocon in malaria. This discovery was published in Nature and solved the mystery of how proteins with an export motif are trafficked out of the infected parasite and into the cytosol of the red blood cell host. This finding has broad impact in biology and also has considerable importance as a major new drug target in malaria.

Together with his principal collaborator Alan Cowman, Crabb is also well known for his development of molecular genetic systems in human malaria, having described the first gene knockout in the causative agent Plasmodium falciparum in a paper published in the journal Cell.

Burnet Institute
Crabb was appointed director and CEO of Burnet Institute in 2008, a position previously held by Ian Gust AO, John Mills AO, Steve Wesselingh, now executive director of the South Australian Health and Medical Research Institute, Ian McKenzie AM, and Mark Hogarth.

Although a molecular scientist by training, Crabb's interests include addressing technical and non-technical barriers to maternal, newborn and child health in the developing world. In recent years, under the banner of Healthy Mothers Healthy Babies, he has established a major research field site in East New Britain in Papua New Guinea, principally to identify the underlying drivers (including malaria) of low birth weight and stunted growth in relatively calorie-rich, yet resource-poor settings.

Under Crabb's leadership, Burnet Institute has continued to focus on improving the health of vulnerable populations through strategic, infrastructure and policy initiatives, especially embedding research as a key pillar of the institute's international development activities. In addition, during Crabb's tenure as director and CEO Burnet has:

 expanded its infrastructure with the completion of the Alfred Centre Stage 2 doubling the capacity of Burnet's laboratory facilities and floor space
 refocused its international development and research programs across the Asia Pacific with a priority on addressing the health issues of Papua New Guinea and Myanmar
 restructured with a programmatic focus on issues of maternal, child  and adolescent health, disease elimination, health security, and behaviours and health risks 
 focused attention on addressing issues of gender equity, and embracing and encouraging diversity within the workplace
 developed commercial activities in Australia and in China (360Biolabs  and Nanjing BioPoint Diagnostic Technologies) supporting the institute's long-term sustainability

Special appointments
As President of the Association of Australian Medical Research Institutes (AAMRI) from 2012 to October 2014, Crabb was a leading advocate for high level policy reform and played critical roles in transformative government policy and funding initiatives, including the generation of the $20b Medical Research Future Fund.

He is a Member of the PATH/Malaria Vaccine Initiative and Vaccine Science Portfolio Advisory Council (VSPAC), USA, and was Co-Founder and Co-Chair of the Inaugural Malaria World Congress  in Melbourne, Australia, in 2018. He holds honorary professorial appointments at Monash University and Melbourne University in Australia. Other special appointments include:
 Member, National Health and Medical Research Council (NHMRC) 
 Member, Victorian Medical Research Strategic Advisory Committee
 Member, Scientific Advisory Board, Centre for Cancer Biology, UniSA and SA Pathology, from 2015 
 Chair, Victorian Chapter of the Association of Australian Medical Research Institutes (VicAAMRI), 2014–ongoing
 Chair, Gordon Conference on Malaria, Tuscany, Italy, 2013  
 Member, Health Exports Advisory Committee, 2013 
 Member, Alfred Medical Research & Education Precinct Council, 2013 
 Member, Scientific Advisory Board, Monash Institute of Pharmaceutical Sciences (MIPS), from 2012
 Board Member, AMREP AS Pty Ltd
 Board of Management, Gene Technology Access Centre
 Member, Scientific Advisory Board, Malaria Program, Wellcome Trust, Sanger Institute, UK
 NHMRC Senior Principal Research Fellow, 2007–08 
 Editor-in-Chief, International Journal for Parasitology, 2006–09  
 NHMRC Principal Research Fellow, 2004–07 
 NHMRC Senior Research Fellow, 2003–04
 International Research Scholar, Howard Hughes Medical Institute, USA, 2000–08

Awards and honours
 Fellow of the Australian Academy of Science, 2021
GSK Award for Research Excellence, 2019 
 Australian True Leader in Medical Research, Australian Financial Review, Boss Magazine, 2016 
 Companion of the Order of Australia for eminent service to medical science as a prominent researcher of infectious diseases, particularly malaria, and their impact on population health in developing nations, as an advocate, mentor and administrator, and through fostering medical research nationally and internationally, 2015 
 Fellow of the Australian Academy of Health and Medical Sciences, 2015  
 Bancroft–Mackerras Medal, Australian Society for Parasitology, 2009  
 Melbourne Top 100 Most Influential People, The Age Magazine, 2007
 David Syme Research Prize, The University of Melbourne, 2006 
 Melbourne Achiever Award, Committee for Melbourne, 2001  
 International Scholar Award, Howard Hughes Medical Institute, USA, 2000 & 2005
 Young Tall Poppy Award (Victoria), Australian Institute of Political Science, 1999

References

1966 births
Living people
Australian medical researchers
Australian virologists
Companions of the Order of Australia
University of Melbourne alumni
Fellows of the Australian Academy of Health and Medical Sciences
Fellows of the Australian Academy of Science